Luigi Aldrovandi Marescotti, Count of Viano, LLD, (5 October 1876 – 9 July 1945) was an Italian politician and diplomat. He was educated at the University of Bologna.

Biography
He graduated in Law in 1897 from the University of Bologna and entered the consular career, following a competition, in 1900. 
Marescotti was an associate of Prime Minister Sidney Sonnino and was appointed to the Paris Conference. He was Envoy Extraordinary and Minister Plenipotentiary in The Hague (February 1920), Sofia (1920 - 1923) and Cairo (March 1923). From November 1923 he was Ambassador to Buenos Aires and from March 1926 to December 1929 to Berlin. 

In 1939 he was appointed Senator of the Kingdom of Italy. He resigned as Senator on 21 October 1944 following the order of the High Court of Justice for sanctions against fascism.

He wrote two autobiographical books, containing various portions of a diary, covering the First World War and its peace treaty seen by him as a spectator of many conferences and talks.

Works
Guerra diplomatica. Ricordi e frammenti di un diario (1914-1919) (1936)
Nuovi ricordi e frammenti di diario (1938)

Honors 
 Grand cordon of the Order of Saints Maurice and Lazarus

 Knight Grand Cross of the Order of the Crown of Italy

See also 
 Lytton Report

References

1876 births
1945 deaths
Members of the Senate of the Kingdom of Italy
University of Bologna alumni
Ambassadors of Italy to Argentina
Ambassadors of Italy to Germany
Ambassadors of Italy to Bulgaria
Italian diplomats
20th-century diplomats